We All Have Demons is the debut studio album by American metalcore band The Color Morale. It was released on September 1, 2009 through Rise Records and was produced by Joey Sturgis. A music video was released for the single "Humannequin".

Critical reception

The album received mostly positive reviews, but also mixed reviews from several critics. JesusFreakHideout rated the album 4 out of 5 and stated: "At the end of this 34-minute album, you realize The Color Morale does it better than most in the genre. There's nothing unique here, but it's more excellent than you would expect from a fairly young band. Their sound is more mature than their age. If you like Underoath, Gwen Stacy, or A Bullet For Pretty Boy, than this one could be your next favorite."

Track listing

Personnel
Credits adapted from AllMusic.

The Color Morale
 Garret Rapp – lead vocals, keyboards
 Ramon Mendoza – lead guitar
 John Bross – rhythm guitar, backing vocals
 Justin Hieser – bass, vocals
 Steve Carey – drums

Additional musicians
 Brian Tombari of City of Ghosts – guest vocals on track 7, "Hopes Anchor"

Additional personnel
 Joey Sturgis – engineering, mixing, mastering, production
 Synapse Design – art direction, design
 Midwestlove Art and Design – band logo
 Glenn Thomas – photography

References

2009 debut albums
Rise Records albums
The Color Morale albums
Albums produced by Joey Sturgis